Majdoul Tower (Arabic: برج مجدول) is a 50-story twisted skyscraper in Riyadh, Saudi Arabia, and is the eighth-tallest twisting tower in the world.

See also
 List of twisted buildings
 List of tallest buildings in Saudi Arabia

References

Towers in Saudi Arabia
Skyscrapers in Riyadh
Twisted buildings and structures
Tourist attractions in Riyadh
2019 establishments in Saudi Arabia
Office buildings completed in 2019